The Harpers Formation is a geologic formation in Maryland, Pennsylvania, Virginia, and West Virginia, consisting of schist, phyllite, and shale. It dates back to the early Cambrian period.  It is considered part of the Chilhowee Group.

Notable exposures
The type section is in gorges of the Potomac River and the Shenandoah River at Harpers Ferry, West Virginia.

The Harpers Formation overlies the Ledger Formation (dolomite) due to a thrust fault in small roadside quarry (currently overgrown) on Pottery Hill, southwest of York, Pennsylvania.

Gallery

References

Cambrian West Virginia